Neil Brown (21 April 1952 – 9 September 2014) was an  Australian rules footballer who played with North Melbourne in the Victorian Football League (VFL). 

A school teacher, he attempted to transfer from North Melbourne to South Melbourne, but instead played for Coburg when the clearance was blocked.  He later returned to Wodonga where he played cricket and football for Wodonga, as well as football for Wangaratta.

Notes

External links 

1952 births
2014 deaths
Australian rules footballers from New South Wales
North Melbourne Football Club players
Wodonga Football Club players
Coburg Football Club players
Wangaratta Football Club players